is a mixed-media project about classical music produced by Bandai Namco Arts and DeNA. An anime television series by MAPPA and Madhouse titled takt op.Destiny aired from October to December 2021. A mobile game developed by Game Studio titled Takt Op. Unmei wa Akaki Senritsu no Machi o will be released in June 2023.

Plot
Takt Op is set in the year 2047, a future world where music cannot be played freely because it attracts monsters called "D2s". These monsters were produced by a black meteorite containing Black Night Siderites which fell from the sky years ago. They hate the music produced by humans and are drawn to the music source and attempt to destroy it, as it is the only thing that can hurt and kill them. To combat the D2s, the Symphonica International Organization and the Musicarts combine their powers to defend the cities from D2s.

Characters

Main

A Conductor who makes a pact with Destiny. He prioritizes music over everything. He generally appears lazy and unfriendly, but he is obsessed with music and has outstanding piano skills. His father was Kenji Asahina, a famous conductor who was killed 10 years ago by the D2s. Takt's right arm has the ability to become a powerful weapon which can transform into a conductor's baton and directs Destiny to fight the D2s.
 / 

A Musicart born from Symphony No. 5 (Beethoven). She was once the human named Cosette Schneider, the younger sister of Anna and Takt's childhood friend, who became a Musicart connected with Takt after she died protecting him from the D2s. Due to her unnatural process of becoming a Musicart, Destiny's condition is deemed unstable and she has no memory of being Cosette. She uses a vast amount of energy combatting D2s and must consume calories to recharge herself and is especially attracted to sweets and cakes.

Takt's childhood friend and the older sister of Cosette—now Destiny. She takes the two of them on a journey to New York on a quest to rectify Destiny's unstable condition. After Destiny's disappearance in episode 12, she became the inheritor of Destiny's musicart identity and joined New York Symphonica as a Conductor.

New York Symphonica

Chief Executive Officer of New York Symphonica, an organization which aims to annihilate D2. He also serves as the Grand Maestro (GM).

A conductor and former Head Commander of New York Symphonica under the Grand Maestro Sagan. He dislikes music because it appeals to the emotions and he pursues his own agenda to gain power and control. 

Leonard, or mostly referred as Lenny, is a conductor with the New York Symphonica who rides a motorcycle and travels with the Musicart Titan. He and Titan help Takt adjust his new life as Conductor. It is revealed that he was a pupil to Kenji Asahina, whose death become a reason for him to fight the D2s. 

Nicknamed Lotte, Charlotte is the older sister of Anna and Cosette who works for New York Symphonica on its Department of Technology Advancement. She lives with their parents in New York and is confined to a wheelchair.

Musicart

A Musicart born from Symphony No. 1 (Mahler) who travels with Lenny. She is carefree and sometimes explains things with onomatopoeia, but shows serious attitude on some occasions.

A Musicart who belongs to New York Symphonica and is paired with the Conductor Grand Maestro Sagan. She uses an umbrella-shaped device which can be used for defense or as a weapon to fire powerful blasts at her enemies.

A Musicart with the New York Symphonica and who has made a pact with Schindler and acts as his protector. She possesses a tuning fork which can emit a tone that gives her the ability to control D2s. Her primary weapons are her feet which she can transform into spinning discs with destructive power.

A Musicart not assigned to a specific Conductor and following her dismissal by Schindler she acts independently. She is born from Die Walküre and her primary weapons are a sword and shield which she can throw like a spinning disc.

A mysterious Musicart who appears following the fusion of Tengoku and Jigoku. The character is based on Jacques Offenbach's Orpheus in the Underworld.

Media

Video game
On March 26, 2021, Bandai Namco Arts and DeNA announced the Takt Op. project, which consists of a mobile game and anime series. The game, titled , is developed by Game Studio. It was initially scheduled to be released in 2021, but was delayed to 2022, and then to June 2023.

Anime
An anime series was announced as part of the project. It was later revealed to be a television series produced by MAPPA and Madhouse titled Takt Op. Destiny (stylized as takt op.Destiny). The series is directed by Yūki Itō, with Kiyoko Yoshimura handling the series' scripts, and Yoshihiro Ike composing the music. LAM provided the original character designs, and Reiko Nagasawa adapted those designs for the anime series. It aired from October 6 to December 22, 2021, on TV Tokyo and its affiliates. Crunchyroll licensed the series outside of Asia. Medialink licensed the series in Southeast Asia, South Asia, and Oceania minus Australia and New Zealand. The company also licensed the anime to Aniplus Asia for TV airings. The opening theme is "takt" by Ryo from Supercell featuring vocals from Mafumafu and gaku, while the ending theme is "Symphonia" by Mika Nakashima.

On April 22, 2022, Crunchyroll announced that the series will receive an English dub, which premiered the following day.

Episode list

Manga
A manga adaptation of Takt Op. Destiny, illustrated by Kino, began serialization in Media Factory's seinen manga magazine Monthly Comic Alive on August 26, 2022. Titled Takt Op. Destiny: Haruka Tsuioku no Anna – Harmony of Hope, the story is told from the viewpoint of the character Anna Schneider.

Notes

References

External links
Project official website 
Game official website 
Anime official website 

Action anime and manga
Android (operating system) games
Bandai Namco franchises
Bandai Visual
Crunchyroll anime
DeNA franchises
Fiction set in 2047
IOS games
Japan-exclusive video games
Japanese role-playing video games
Madhouse (company)
MAPPA
Media Factory manga
Mobile games
Music in anime and manga
Science fiction anime and manga
Seinen manga
TV Tokyo original programming
Upcoming video games scheduled for 2023
Video games developed in Japan
Works about classical music